Oroidin is a bromopyrrole alkaloid, originally isolated from sponges in the genus Agelas. Oroidin possesses moderate antimalarial activity.

References

Antimalarial agents
Halogen-containing alkaloids